Listen to the Silence is a live album by George Russell originally recorded in 1971 and released on the Concept label in 1973, featuring a performance by Russell with Stanton Davis, Jan Garbarek, Terje Rypdal, Arild Andersen, and Jon Christensen with vocal chorus.

Reception
The Allmusic review awarded the album 3 stars.

Track listing
All compositions by George Russell - Text Credits: "Bury My Heart at Wounded Knee" by Dee Brown, "The Mark" by Maurice Nicoll, "Duino Elegies" by Rainer Maria Rilke
 "Event I" - 6:31  
 "Event II" - 8:19  
 "Event III" - 16:18  
 "Event IV" - 13:56  
Recorded the Kongsberg Church in Kongsberg, Norway on June 26, 1971.

Personnel
George Russell - timpani, arranger
Stanton Davis - trumpet
Jan Garbarek - tenor saxophone
Terje Rypdal - electric guitar
Webster Lewis - organ   
Bobo Stenson - electric piano  
Bjørnar Andresen - fender bass  
Arild Andersen - acoustic bass  
Jon Christensen - percussion 
Chorus of the Conservatory of Music in Oslo, Norway - Arnulv Hegstad, conductor
Supplementally Chorus from the New England Conservatory  
Sue Auclair, Gailanne Cummings - soprano voice  
Joyce Gippo, Kay Dunlap - alto voice 
David Dusing, Ray Hardin - tenor voice  
Don Kendrick, Don Hovey, Dan Windham - bass voice

References

Jan Garbarek live albums
George Russell (composer) live albums